

Zvi Goldstein (born January 21, 1947) is an Israeli visual artist living in Jerusalem.

Life and Works 
Goldstein was born to Hungarian-Jewish parents in 1947 in Cluj, Romania. He is the only son of Szigmund Goldstein (born 30 August 1917), a taxi driver, and Margaret Golstein (born 2 February 1919). His father survived Mauthausen and returned to Cluj, where he met his future wife, an Auschwitz survivor. Zvi Golstein spent his early childhood in Cluj and often went hiking with his father in the Carpathian Mountains.

He attended elementary school, during which he suffered numerous anti-Semitic attacks at and after school.

In 1958 he and his parents emigrated to Kiryat Gat, Israel, with the help of the American Jewish Joint Distribution Committee. In 1962 he left school after tenth grade, and between 1962 and 1963 he worked at Polgat Textiles in Kiryat Gat. In 1963 Goldstein applied for the Bezalel Academy of Arts and Design in Jerusalem but was rejected. In 1964 he tried again and was accepted, and he began his studies in the Graphic Department as the youngest student in his class.

In November 1964 Zvi Goldstein had to interrupt his studies at the Academy to fulfill his mandatory military service. He served in the Israeli army for two years and four months. In January 1967, towards the end of his military service, he was allowed to return to the Bezalel Academy under certain conditions. He returned to the army to serve a further two months in April and May. As a young servant, he was called for the Six-Day War in June in the Gaza Strip and the Sinai Desert front. Following this he is stationed as a reservist at various locations in Israeli for the next six months. In 1968 he finally returned to the Academy but the year after he broke off his studies to travel to Europe. He departed with hardly any money, just one bag and a one-way-ticket, financed by money from the Academy as the winner of the Hermann Struck Prize (with a wood engraving). In the West for the first time, he hitchhiked through Europe (France, Sweden, Denmark, Switzerland, Belgium, Italy) and made a short trip to the United States, New York City, to visit Sol LeWitt, whom he knew from his time in Milan.

He enrolled at the Accademia di Belle Arti di Brera in Milan in the Painting and Sculpture Department and made frequent visit to the Faculty of Philosophy at the Università degli Studi di Milano. In 1972 Goldstein was awarded a Diploma in Fine Arts and Sculpture and continued his studies in the Scenography Department. Later that year he had his first solo exhibition in Milan at the Galleria la Bertesca.

In 1973 he married Rachel Bitran.

Zvi Goldstein moved back to Jerusalem to establish a peripheral position from which to developed a new artistic perspective. He embarked on extensive research into other contexts marginal to the West, sowing the seeds for his future travels. At the same time he became a lecturer in the Fine Arts Department at the Bezalel Academy of Arts and Design: his first teaching post.

In 1982 he was recalled to the army during the first Lebanon War and served in patrol operations. In the years after he was ordered to serve at the detention camp, where prisoners were detained without trial. Faced with this evidence of civil rights infringements, he refused to serve as a soldier in Lebanon. He was imprisoned as a conscientious objector, first at the Tzrifin military camp, near Rischon LeZion, and then in Prison Six, near Atlit. He became one of the first members of Yesh Gvul. Eventually he was released early from prison, but remained on the Israeli army reserve list until 1991.

In the 1990s a number of carefully prepared travels took him to particular places in Greece, Turkey, Asia and mainly in Africa, following a quest for cultures and sites still under a strong non-Western and hermetical tradition.

During the 1970s Goldstein worked within the tradition of conceptual art using photography, film, audio recordings, performance, objects, and not at least text as his media exploring perceptional, social and political phenomena. Discontented with the Post-Modern discourse in the West, in 1978 he decided to choose Jerusalem as a place on the edge between Orient and Occident and made it the geographical as well as conceptual base for his art. At the same time he turned to object-related sculpture based on a kind of open constructivist approach. In the 2000s Goldstein gave his work a new and additional dimension by two books, which are not written in his mother tongue(s) but in a particular kind of English, both readable and idiosyncratic, to fit into the dominant language of global communication. In On Paper (Cologne 2004) stories and reflections on subjects like autobiography, gardening, philosophy, war, art theory, or lifestyle blend into an impressive picture of his position between different cultures. The book was followed by a long poem titled Room 205 (Cologne 2010) which describes the musings and hallucinations during a one-minute open-eye recall.

Exhibitions

Selected solo-exhibitions
 2017 – Tel Aviv Museum of Art, Tel-Aviv, Israel
 2016 – S.M.A.K., Ghent, Belgium
 2015  – Reconstructed Memories (Lariam B), Daniel Marzona art gallery, Berlin
 2010 – The Israel Museum, Jerusalem, Israel
 1998 – Kunsthalle Nürnberg, Nürnberg, Germany, and Kaiser Wilhelm Museum, Krefeld, Germany
 1995 – Mala Galerija, Moderna Galerija, Ljublijana, Slovenia
 1993 – The Art Gallery of York University, Toronto, Canada
 1992 – De Appel, Amsterdam, Holland
 1990 – D.A.A.D. Galerie, Berlin, Germany
 1989 – Kunstraum München, Munich, Germany
 1987 – Center Georges Pompidou, Paris, France
 1986 – Museum Haus Esters, Krefeld, Germany
 1983 – The Tel-Aviv Museum, Tel-Aviv, Israel
 1975 – The Israel Museum, Jerusalem, Israel

Selected group-exhibitions
 2019 – The Collection (1) – Hightlights for a Future, S.M.A.K., Ghent, Belgium
 2013 – Zugaben, Museum Haus Lange / Haus Esters, Krefeld, Germany
 2011 – Herzliya Biennial for Contemporary Art, Herzliya, Israel
 2011 – The Second Strike, Herzliya Museum of Contemporary Art, Herzliya, Israel
 2010 – Haunted by Objects, The Israel Museum, Jerusalem, Israel
 2008 – The 6th Shanghai Biennale, Shanghai, China.
 2005 – EindhovenIstanbul, Van Abbemuseum, Eindhoven, The Netherlands
 2002 – Startkapital, K21 Kunstammlung Nordrhein-Westfalen, Düsseldorf, Germany
 2000 – The Oldest Possible Memory, Sammlung Hauser und Wirth in der Lokremise St. Gallen, Switzerland
 1998 – Biennial of San Paolo, San Paolo, Brazil.
 1995 – New Orient/Ation, The 4th Istanbul Biennial, Istanbul, Turkey
 1990 – The Ready Made Boomerang, The 8th Biennial of Sydney, Sydney, Australia
 1988 – Aperto 88, La Biennale di Venezia, Venice, Italy
 1987 – Documenta VIII, Kassel, Germany
 1978 – Kulturhaus, Graz, Austria
 1974 – Contemporanea, Area Aperta, Rome, Italy

Collections (selected) 
 The Israel Museum, Jerusalem, Israel
 The Tel-Aviv Museum, Tel-Aviv, Israel
 Kunstmuseen Krefeld, Germany
 Centre Pompidou, Paris
 Sammlung Hauser und Wirth, Switzerland
 F.C. Flick Collection

Awards 
 2013 - Awarded with the EMET Prize in the category Art and Culture
 2002 – The LennonOno Grant for Peace, New York
 1990 – D.A.A.D Berliner Künstlerprogramm (artist in residence), Berlin, Germany
 1988 – Prize of the Ministry of Education and Culture, Israel
 1987 - Aaron Levi Prize of The Israel Museum, Jerusalem, Israel
 1985 – Mies van der Rohe-Stipendium (artist in residence), Krefeld, Germany
 1984 – The Sandberg Prize of The Israel Museum, Jerusalem, Israel

Catalogues of solo-exhibitions 
 Zvi Goldstein, The Israel Museum, Jerusalem, Israel, 1975
 Zvi Goldstein – Structure and Super-Structure, The Tel-Aviv Museum, Tel-Aviv, Israel, 1983
 Zvi Goldstein – Die Sprache des Bauens, Museum Haus Esters, Krefeld, Germany, 1986
 Zvi Goldstein -Tiers-Monde et Monde 3 – Modeles Anomaux, Centre Georges Pompidou, Paris, France, 1987
 Zvi Goldstein – The Glory of Abstraction, Kunstraum München, Munich, Germany, 1989
 Zvi Goldstein – Black Hole Constructions, D.A.A.D. Gallery, Berlin, Germany, 1990
 Zvi Goldstein, De Appel, Amsterdam, The Netherlands, 1992
 Zvi Goldstein, Mala Galerija, Liublijana, Slovenia, 1995
 Zvi Goldstein, The Israel Museum, Jerusalem, Israel, 1995
 Zvi Goldstein – To Be There, Kunsthalle Nürnberg and Krefelder Kunstmuseen, Oktagon, Germany 1998
 Zvi Goldstein – Sirocco – Day 4, 24th International Biennial of São Paulo, São Paulo, Brazil 1998

Books by the artist 
 Zvi Goldstein, On Paper, Verlag der Buchhandlung Walther König, Cologne, Germany, 2004 (= Kunstwissenschaftliche Bibliothek, vol. 29)
 Zvi Goldstein, Room 205, Verlag der Buchhandlung Walther König, Cologne, Germany, 2010

External links 
 www.zvigoldstein.org
 https://www.danielmarzona.com/artists/zvi-goldstein/

References 
 Zvi Goldstein, On Paper, Verlag der Buchhandlung Walther König, Cologne, Germany, 2004 (= Kunstwissenschaftliche Bibliothek, vol. 29)
 Zvi Goldstein – To Be There, Kunsthalle Nürnberg and Krefelder Kunstmuseen, Oktagon, Germany 1998
 Zvi Goldstein, Room 205, Verlag der Buchhandlung Walther König, Cologne, Germany, 2010
 https://web.archive.org/web/20100803072042/http://www.imj.org.il:80/exhibitions/presentation/exhibit.asp?id=724

1947 births
Living people
Israeli contemporary artists
Israeli people of Hungarian-Jewish descent
Romanian emigrants to Israel
People from Jerusalem
Bezalel Academy of Arts and Design alumni
Brera Academy alumni